Tatuamunha River is a river of Alagoas state in eastern Brazil. It flows into the Atlantic Ocean at the eponymous Tatuamunha in Porto de Pedras.

See also
List of rivers of Alagoas

References
Brazilian Ministry of Transport

Rivers of Alagoas